2017 in continental European music in geographical order.

Events
11 January – Elbphilharmonie in Hamburg, Germany, is opened with a concert by the NDR Elbphilharmonie Orchestra, the NDR Chor and conductor Thomas Hengelbrock.
13 May – Final of the Eurovision Song Contest 2017 takes place in Kyiv, Ukraine. It is won for the first time by Portugal, represented by Salvador Sobral with the song "Amar pelos dois".
8 September – Eurovision winner Salvador Sobral gives a farewell concert, prior to being admitted to hospital in the hope of receiving a heart transplant.

Scandinavia
Main article for Scandinavian music in 2017

Top hits
Danish #1s
Finnish #1 singles 2017, Finnish #1 albums
Norway charts
Swedish #1 singles and albums

Netherlands
Dutch #1 singles

Ireland
Main article for Irish music in 2017

UK
Main article for British music in 2017

Germany
German number ones

Switzerland and Austria
Swiss #1s

France
French #1s

Italy
Italian number ones

Eastern Europe/ Balkans
List of Polish #1 singles
Czech #1 singles
Hungarian #1 singles

Musical films
Ammore e malavita (Italy)
Dalida (France)
Jeannette: The Childhood of Joan of Arc (France)

Deaths
4 January – Georges Prêtre, 92, French orchestral and opera conductor
13 January 
Anton Nanut, 84, Slovenian conductor
Jan Stoeckart, 89, Dutch composer, conductor and trombonist
16 January – Gerd Grochowski, 60, German opera singer 
18 January – Ståle Wikshåland, 63, Norwegian musicologist (blood clot)
20 January – Frank Thomas, 80, French songwriter.
21 January – Veljo Tormis, 86, Estonian composer
22 January 
Jean Georgakarakos (Karakos), 76, French music producer
Jaki Liebezeit, 78, German drummer (Can)
27 January – Henry-Louis de La Grange, 92, French musicologist, biographer of Gustav Mahler
28 January – Alexander Tikhanovich, 64, Belarusian pop singer (Verasy).
31 January
Deke Leonard, 72, Welsh rock guitarist (Man)
John Wetton, 67, British bassist (cancer)
7 February
Svend Asmussen, 100, Danish jazz violinist
Loukianos Kilaidonis, 73, Greek singer-songwriter
8 February – Tony Särkkä, 44, Swedish multi-instrumentalist (Abruptum, Ophthalamia)
11 February – Jarmila Šuláková, 87, Czech folk singer.
17 February – Peter Skellern, 69, English singer-songwriter (brain tumour)
21 February – Enzo Carella, 65, Italian singer-songwriter
27 February 
Jórunn Viðar, 98, Icelandic pianist and composer
Eva Maria Zuk, 71, Polish-born Mexican pianist
3 March – Misha Mengelberg, 81, Ukrainian-born Dutch jazz pianist and composer
5 March – Kurt Moll, 78, German opera singer
6 March – Alberto Zedda, 89, Italian conductor and musicologist
9 March – Barbara Helsingius, 79, Finnish singer, poet and Olympic fencer 
9 April – Stan Robinson, 80, British jazz tenor saxophonist and flautist
18 April – Frank Dostal, 71, German music producer and songwriter
19 April – Pat Fitzpatrick, 60, Irish keyboardist (cancer)
27 April – Eduard Brunner, 77, Swiss clarinetist
1 May – Erkki Kurenniemi, 75, Finnish musician
2 May – Péter Komlós, 81, Hungarian violinist
8 May – Mary Tsoni, 30, Greek actress and singer (Dogtooth)
9 May – Robert Miles, 47, Italian electronic dance musician and record producer
22 May – Zbigniew Wodecki, 67, Polish singer, composer and musician
6 June – Sandra Reemer, 66, Dutch singer (breast cancer)
11 June – Corneliu Stroe, Romanian jazz drummer and percussionist, 67 (heart attack)
22 June – Gunter Gabriel, 75, German singer, musician and composer
2 July – Chris Roberts, 73, German schlager singer (cancer)
3 July – Rudy Rotta, 66, Italian blues guitarist and singer
5 July – Pierre Henry, 89, French composer
9 July – Paquita Rico, 87, Spanish singer and actress
13 July
Giannis Kalatzis, 74, Greek singer
Egil Kapstad, 76, Norwegian jazz pianist, arranger and composer
19 July – Barbara Weldens, 35, French singer (electrocuted on stage)
20 July – Andrea Jürgens, 50, German schlager singer (kidney failure)
23 July – Thomas Füri, 70, Swiss violinist (I Salonisti)
26 July – Paul Angerer, 90, Austrian conductor, violist, composer, and radio presenter
8 August – Pēteris Plakidis, 70, Latvian composer and pianist
9 August – Marián Varga, 70, Slovak organist and composer
20 August
Margot Hielscher, 97, German singer and film actress
Wilhelm Killmayer, 89, German composer, conductor, and lecturer
Nati Mistral, 88, Spanish actress and singer
24 August – Aloys Kontarsky, 86, German pianist
25 August – Enzo Dara, Italian opera singer, 78
27 September – Joy Fleming, 72, German singer
2 October – Klaus Huber, 92, Swiss composer and academic
8 October – László Aradszky, 82, Hungarian pop singer
3 November
Gaetano Bardini, 91, Italian opera singer
Václav Riedlbauch, 70, Czech composer, pedagogue and manager, Minister of Culture (2009–2010)
9 November – , 70, Dutch singer and musician, winner of Golden Harp
12 November – Michel Chapuis, 87, French classical organist and pedagogue
24 November – Clotilde Rosa, 87, Portuguese harpist, teacher and composer7
30 November – , 61, Portuguese guitarist

References

External links
 European Music Council 

2017 in music